Juke Box Jury was a music panel show which ran on BBC Television between 1 June 1959 and 27 December 1967. The programme was based on the American show Jukebox Jury, itself an offshoot of a long-running radio series. The American series, which was televised, aired from 1953 to 1959 and was hosted by Peter Potter, Suzanne Alexander, Jean Moorhead, and Lisa Davis.

The series featured celebrity showbusiness guests on a rotating weekly panel who were asked to judge the hit potential of recent record releases. By 1962 the programme was attracting 12 million viewers weekly on Saturday nights.

The concept was later revived by the BBC for one series in 1979 and a further two series in 1989/1990.

Format
Juke Box Jury took a format where a guest panel reviewed new record releases in a 25-minute programme, extended to an hour for some Christmas shows. The format was drawn from that of the US TV series, Jukebox Jury. Host David Jacobs each week asked four celebrities (the 'Jurors') to judge newly released records on his jukebox (a Rock-Ola Tempo II) and forecast which would be declared a "hit" or a "miss" – the decision accompanied by either a bell for a 'hit' or a hooter for a 'miss'. A panel of three members of the audience voted as a tie-breaker if the guests' decision was deadlocked, by holding up a large circular disc with 'Hit' on one side and 'Miss' on the other. Most weeks the performers of one of the records would be hidden behind a screen and emerge to "surprise" the panel after they had given their verdict.

The series was usually broadcast from the BBC TV Theatre, Shepherd's Bush Green, London. Each programme normally consisted of between seven and nine records. Those editions which were pre-recorded normally followed a live transmission, and broadcast in the regular slot.

History

1959–1967
Juke Box Jury was first broadcast on BBC Television on 1 June 1959. Originally on Monday evenings, the BBC show was moved to early Saturday evenings starting on 3 September 1959 due to its immediate popularity. The series was produced by Russell Turner.

The original panel consisted of Pete Murray, Alma Cogan, Gary Miller and Susan Stranks, who gave a 'teenager's view'. Murray appeared every week for the first 11 episodes, however, generally the panel of judges changed from week to week and mainly featured current stars from music, television and film. The panel normally comprised two male and two female guests, many of whom appeared more than once. Singers Gary Miller and Alma Cogan were regular panelists in the early shows. Actor Eric Sykes was often a panelist and Katie Boyle was a frequent Juror (appearing at least 37 times), as were Lulu and Cilla Black, who appeared twelve and nine times respectively. From 31 December 1966, a regular panel was established for eight consecutive editions. Jimmy Savile, Simon Dee, Alan Freeman and Pete Murray sat in judgement for all these programmes, having first appeared together on 3 December 1966. From 25 February until 1 April, the foursome continued as regular panelists, but alternating in pairs each week, with Savile and Murray appearing together, followed by Freeman and Dee. Among the diverse others from the world of entertainment who appeared were Thora Hird, Alfred Hitchcock, Spike Milligan, Lonnie Donegan, Johnny Mathis, Roy Orbison and David McCallum.

By October 1959 Juke Box Jury had reached a weekly audience of almost 9 million viewers. Bill Cotton took over production of the series during 1960, to be followed later in the year by Stewart Morris and then Neville Wortman, who was to remain the producer until the series ended in 1967.

On 7 December 1963, the panel was the four Beatles, while George Harrison and Ringo Starr both appeared separately later, as did their manager Brian Epstein, who was twice a panellist. John Lennon had already appeared on 29 June 1963. Then on 4 July 1964 the five members of the Rolling Stones formed the panel, the only time there were more than four Jurors on the programme. Keith Richards later wrote of this appearance: "We didn't give a shit.... We just trashed every record they played."

By early 1962, Juke Box Jury had a weekly audience of over 12 million viewers, while the Beatles appearance on 7 December 1963 garnered an audience of 23 million, and news of the Rolling Stones' appearance the following June garnered 10,000 applications to the BBC for tickets for the recording. The attraction of the programme deftly crossed generational boundaries – younger viewers revelling in the appearance of their current pop stars, while older adults identified with the often anti-pop sentiments of the panellists from a non-musical or older background, confirming "adult and youthful prejudices at the same time"'.

In January 1967, the Sunday tabloid newspaper News of the World in a series of attacks on the new hippy sub-culture and LSD, castigated David Jacobs in one article for playing the Mothers of Invention single "It Can't Happen Here" on a Juke Box Jury broadcast in November 1966 as it was 'recorded on a trip', and also blamed two of the jury for voting it a hit. The jury on this occasion included Bobby Goldsboro, Susan Maughan and comedian Ted Rogers. In fact, by the time of the article, the BBC had already cut seven minutes from the 7 January 1967 programme because of drug references in one of that week's chosen songs, "The Addicted Man" by the Game, which had resulted in universal disapproval by the Jurors during an extended discussion. This was part of a new policy for the programme during its last year of broadcast, when a regular panel of four disc jockeys was introduced, with a more detailed discussion of each song.

On 24 December 1966 and again on 5 August 1967 the Seekers became only the fourth band to appear as Jurors in the series, appearing just a few weeks after The Bachelors. The programme had by this time seen a drop in ratings, and from 27 September 1967 Juke Box Jury was moved from its prime place in the Saturday evening schedules and transmitted on early Wednesday evenings, replaced in the key Saturday slot by Dee Time. On November 8, 1967, the scheduled edition of the show was cancelled without notice, leading to speculation the show was to end. At the end of 1967, Juke Box Jury was dropped from the BBC schedule because of its falling ratings, and the last broadcast was on 27 December 1967, with original Jurors Pete Murray and Susan Stranks appearing once more.

David Jacobs hosted a one off Juke Box Jury in 1989 to mark the centenary of the phonograph. Pete Murray was on the panel.

Post 1967
The programme has been revived twice, first in 1979 with Noel Edmonds as presenter, and then with Jools Holland for two seasons in 1989/1990, ending on 25 November 1990. Frequent jurors from the original run Katie Boyle & Lulu both returned for the Jools Holland era, which also included impressionist Steve Nallon on the panel impersonating the sitting Prime Minister Margaret Thatcher. The 1979 series was most notable for a panel containing Johnny Rotten (John Lydon), who gave a characteristically acerbic performance before walking out before the end of 30 June 1979 programme.

The final televised edition of Juke Box Jury aired on BBC2 on 25 November 1990. Dusty Springfield was on the final panel, joining Alan Freeman who appeared on 30 September 1990, as the only personalities to feature as jurors in all three eras of the television run. Lulu appeared in the 1990s run, but was not a juror during the 1979 series, although her single "I Love To Boogie" was featured in the series; where it was erroneously judged to be a likely hit.

BBC Radio Merseyside has run a radio version of Juke Box Jury for some years, hosted by Spencer Leigh and normally broadcast under the programme name On The Beat although it is often scheduled as Juke Box Jury. The broadcaster Chris Evans also ran a variation of the format in 2008 on his BBC Radio 2 'Chris Evans Drivetime' programme, where listeners were invited to text either 'hit' or 'miss', plus their comments, to the programme.

The format also crossed over into children's television on Going Live! and later Live and Kicking having a segment entitled 'Trev and Simon's Video Galleon" (also Garden/Goldmine and Grandprix).

Surviving recordings
Because of the BBC's policy of wiping tapes of its programmes in the 1960s, and the practice of not recording live programmes, only two episodes (29 October 1960 and 12 November 1960) are thought to still exist in their complete form, although transcripts also exist of the Beatles' appearances – both solo and together. In 2001, during a year-long drive to find lost archive material, the BBC announced that an audio recording of the Beatles' appearance in December 1963 had re-surfaced, a tape taken directly from the television broadcast.

Theme music
For the first six weeks of the programme, the theme to Juke Box Jury was "Juke Box Fury", written by composer and arranger Tony Osborne and recorded by his band under the name Ozzie Warlock and the Wizards.

The programme's producer Russell Turner then replaced the theme with another instrumental, "Hit and Miss", performed by the John Barry Seven Plus Four, which remained the title music from 1960 to 1967. For the last few months of the original series this was replaced by a version recorded by the Ted Heath Band.

The 1989–1990 Jools Holland series also featured "Hit and Miss", this time recorded by Courtney Pine.

Cultural references
Juke Box Jury has a history of being parodied, and the format has been used a number of times for other programmes:

In 1959, the BBC refused Tommy Steele permission to use David Jacobs in a Juke Box Jury comedy sketch for his Tommy Steele Show on ATV. The sketch went ahead in October 1959 with another BBC personality, announcer McDonald Hobley taking Jacobs' part.

Benny Hill parodied the show as 'Soap Box Jury' on a show for the BBC on 4 March 1961. He impersonated David Jacobs and the panellists, one of whom was called "Fred Curry", a takeoff on Pete Murray and another "Lady Edgware", a takeoff on Lady Isobel Barnett – the joke being that Barnet and Edgware are neighbouring London suburbs. The sketch ended with a shot of Hill as all four panellists in one shot, achieved through filming each "panellist" separately and keeping the other three-fourths of the lens covered, which made this a landmark in both Hill's career and the development of television production. The sketch can be seen on the DVD compilation Benny Hill: The Lost Years, which was released in 2005.

Also in 1961, comedian Jimmy Edwards promoted a tea-shop band 'The Burke Adams Tea-Time Three', who had a record judged a hit on Juke Box Jury, in "The Face of Enthusiasm", part of his Faces of Jim comedy series.

Finnish television ran its own version of Juke Box Jury called Levyraati. The Finnish version long outlasted Juke Box Jury – it ran from 1961 to 1992, and has both been revived since, and also re-imagined as Videoraati by Finnish cable TV channel MoonTV.

On 7 July 1962, BBC TV broadcast "Twist Music With a Beat", a pop music programme about the dance craze 'The Twist', featuring a Twist competition between Juke Box Jury members and members of the cast of Compact. The show featured Petula Clark, Don Lang & His Twisters, Tony Osborne & His Mellow Men and the Viscounts.

A ten-minute version of Juke Box Jury also featured as part of a regular 1960s BBC Christmas Day variety show Christmas Night with the Stars on Christmas Day 1962 and 1963.

The 1963 Gordon Flemyng film about the pop music industry Just For Fun had a Juke Box Jury section which featured David Jacobs in his usual host position while Jimmy Savile, Alan Freeman and Dick Emery played the jury panel. The film was scripted by Milton Subotsky, who was one of the earliest guests on the programme.

In 1964, the Rolling Stones recorded an advert for the breakfast cereal Rice Krispies, which used themes from the programme including a jukebox, studio audience scenes and both the 'Hit' button and the 'Hit' signs that the audience jury used.

The British comedy duo French and Saunders, who appeared on the programme in 1989, referred to Juke Box Jury in their parody of What Ever Happened to Baby Jane? in their eponymous 1990 comedy series.

The Generation X 1978 song "Ready Steady Go!" referenced the programme in its lyrics: "I'm not in love with Juke Box Jury/I'm not in love with Thank Your Lucky Stars".

Ian Dury and The Blockheads named their November 1981 album, Juke Box Dury.

In 1989, BBC TV's Arena produced a programme titled "Juke Box Jury" to commemorate the centenary of the jukebox. Hosted by David Jacobs, it also featured Juke Box Jury regulars Pete Murray and Dusty Springfield, with Phil Collins and Sarah Jane Morris making up the rest of the team.

The Late Show programme, "Classical Juke Box Jury" (1990) was a spoof of Juke Box Jury, in which a panel of three people with a background in classical music voted on different versions of Beethoven's 9th Symphony by a variety of conductors.

Jurors
An incomplete list of the guest panellists. Each week had four guest 'Jurors', often plus one surprise artist chosen from among the records played that week.

1959–1967
David Jacobs was host throughout the series 1959–1967, with regular panellist Pete Murray standing in on a number of occasions.

1959
 1 June 1959  –  Pete Murray, Alma Cogan, Gary Miller, Susan Stranks
 8 June 1959 - Pete Murray, Gary Miller, Alma Cogan, Susan Stranks
 15 June 1959 –  Alma Cogan, Gary Miller, Mandy Miller, Pete Murray
 22 June 1959 - Eric Sykes, Shani Wallis, Pete Murray, Susan Stranks
 6 July 1959 - Eric Sykes, Shani Wallis, Mandy Miller, Pete Murray
 13 July 1959  –  Eric Sykes, Petula Clark, Pete Murray, Susan Stranks
 27 July 1959 –  Petula Clark, Eric Sykes, Pete Murray, Susan Stranks
 10 August 1959  –  Eric Sykes, Pete Murray, Jill Chadwick, The Poni-Tails
 17 August 1959 - Diana Dors, Pete Murray, Sheila Dixon, Dickie Dawson
 24 August 1959 - Venetia Stevenson, Pete Murray, Judy Carne, Dickie Dawson
 5 September 1959  – Eric Sykes, Cleo Laine, Susan Stranks, Pete Murray
 12 September 1959 - Peggy Cummins, Eric Sykes, Eric Robinson, Susan Stranks
 19 September 1959 - Bill Maynard, Petula Clark, Judy Carne, Peter Noble
 26 September 1959  –  Richard Dawson, Diana Dors, Eunice Gayson, Tony Vlassopolu
 3 October 1959 –  Diana Dors, Tony Osborne, Dickie Dawson, Petula Clark
 10 October 1959 - Gary Miller, Milton Subotsky, Venetia Stevenson, Gloria Kindersley
 17 October 1959 - Digby Wolfe, Alma Cogan, Louie Ramsay, Jimmy Savile
 24 October 1959  –  Winifred Atwell, Paul Carpenter, Sandra Dorne, Digby Wolfe
 31 October 1959 –  Digby Wolfe, Gary Miller, Venetia Stevenson, Lynn Curtis
 14 November 1959 - Gary Miller, Venetia Stevenson, Bunny Lewis, Jeanne Baldwin
 21 November 1959 - Joan Heal, Venetia Stevenson, Milton Subotsky, Pete Murray
 28 November 1959 - Digby Wolfe, Peter Noble, Judy Carne, Sylvie St. Clair
 5  December 1959 - Russ Conway, Eric Sykes, Nancy Spain, Joan North
 12 December 1959 –  Russ Conway, Eric Sykes, Anthea Askey, Venetia Stevenson
 19 December 1959 - Eric Sykes, Russ Conway, Katie Boyle, Patricia Bredin

1960

In addition to David Jacobs hosting, Vicki Smith was 'hostess' for the first few programmes.

 2 January 1960  –  Gilbert Harding, Peggy Cummins, Pete Murray, Carolyn Townshend
 9 January 1960 – Gilbert Harding, Lionel Bart, Shirley Anne Field, Anita Prynne
 16 January 1960 - Joni James, Anthea Askey, Eric Robinson, Jimmy Henney
 23 January 1960 – Alan Freeman, Patricia Bredin, Katie Boyle, Cyril Shack
 30 January 1960 – Shirley Eaton, Bunny Lewis, Frank Weir, Susan Stranks
 6 February 1960 - Wolf Mankowitz, Michael Craig, Nancy Spain, Henrietta Tiarks
 13 February 1960 - Pete Murray, Alan Freeman, Carolyn Townshend, Esmee Clinton
 20 February 1960 - Ted Ray, Anthea Askey, Jeannette Sterk, Alan Freeman
 27 February 1960 - Eric Sykes, Lorrae Desmond, Henrietta Tiarks, Alan Freeman
 5 March 1960 – Spike Milligan, Jack Payne, Jacquay Kinson, Nancy Spain
 12 March 1960 - Pete Murray, Paul Carpenter, Katie Boyle, June Sylvaine
 19 March 1960 – Sam Costa, Ted Ray, Lord Donegall, Lee Hamilton
 26 March 1960 - Pete Murray, Jack Payne, Jean Metcalfe, Alan Freeman
 2 April 1960 – Frankie Day, Wolf Mankowitz, Eric Sykes, Katie Boyle
 9 April 1960 - Hattie Jacques, Paul Carpenter, Nancy Spain, Eric Sykes
 16 April 1960 – Anne Rogers, Eric Robinson, Sheila Gallagher, Gary Miller
 23 April 1960 - Jack Payne, Eric Sykes, Pete Murray, David Hughes
 30 April 1960 - Johnny Preston, Gary Miller, Humphrey Lyttelton, Buddy Kaye
 7 May 1960 - Nancy Pederson, Karen Post, Doug Levy, Ed Robertson (Four Teenage students from the American Dependent High School, Bushy Park)
 14 May 1960 – Katie Boyle, Russ Conway, Roy Castle, Jeannette Sterk
 21 May 1960 - Jack Payne, Jean Metcalfe, Bunny Lewis, Viscountess Lewisham
 4 June 1960 – Henrietta Tiarks, Ted Ray, Carole Carr, Pete Murray
 11 June 1960 – Peter West, Dora Bryan, Judy Carne, Jimmy Henney
 18 June 1960 - Digby Wolfe, Millicent Martin, Carole Carr, Eric Winstone
 2 July 1960 - Carmen Dragon, Pete Murray, Anthea Askey, Ed Robertson
 9 July 1960 - Katie Boyle, Peter Noble, Alan Dell, June Marlow
 16 July 1960 – Katie Boyle, Judy Carne, Sid James, Eric Sykes
 30 July 1960 - Arthur Askey, Anthea Askey, Peter Haigh, Susan Stranks
 6 August 1960 - Stirling Moss, Kenneth Wolstenholme, Bunny Lewis, Judy Huxtable
 13 August 1960 - Ted Heath, Millicent Martin, Pete Murray, Judy Thorburn
 20 August 1960 – Dave King, Nancy Spain, Henrietta Tiarks, Alan Freeman
 27 August 1960 - David Hughes, Sheila Buxton, Mildred Mayne, Lionel Bart
 3 September 1960 – no programme due to Olympics coverage
 10 September 1960 – Rosemary Squires, Paul Carpenter, Geoff Love, Annette Funicello
 17 September 1960 - Capucine, Terence Morgan, Jimmy Henney, Toni Eden
 24 September 1960 - Eric Sykes, Lita Roza, Katie Boyle, Don Moss
 1 October 1960 - Eric Sykes, Petula Clark, George Chisholm, Judy Carne
 8 October 1960 – Pete Murray, Katie Boyle, Janie Marden, Phil Foster
 15 October 1960 – Sydney Shaw, Jill Day, Bunny Lewis, Shirley Bassey (Bassey revealed on air as a 'surprise guest')
 22 October 1960 - Eric Sykes, Carole Carr, Jimmy Henney and 'A Surprise Guest'
 29 October 1960 – Carmen McRae, Pete Murray, Nancy Spain, Richard Wyler (surprise guest - Ted Taylor)
 5 November 1960 - Katie Boyle, Frank Muir, Denis Norden and 'A Surprise Guest'
 12 November 1960 – Jill Ireland, David McCallum, Frederik van Pallandt and Nina van Pallandt (Nina & Frederik), Colin Day (Day revealed on air as a 'surprise guest') This is one of the few surviving episodes: https://www.youtube.com/watch?v=b3y-wNnh3g0
 19 November 1960 - Jeanne Carson, Sid James, Eric Sykes and a 'surprise guest'
 26 November 1960 - Marion Keene, Pete Murray, Paul Carpenter and a 'surprise guest'
 3 December 1960 - David Kossoff, Lita Roza, Richard Wyler and a 'surprise guest'
 10 December 1960 – Larry Adler, Susan Stranks, Godfrey Winn and a 'surprise guest'
 17 December 1960 - Anne Shelton, Barbara Sheller, Tony Osborne and a 'surprise guest'
 24 December 1960 - Peter Sellers, Russ Conway, Katie Boyle and a 'surprise guest'
 31 December 1960 - Denis Norden, Frank Muir, Beth Rogan and a 'surprise guest'

1961
 7 January 1961 – Lisa Gastoni, Jimmy Henney, Pete Murray and a 'surprise guest'
 14 January 1961 - Dick Bentley, Steve Race, Katie Boyle and a 'surprise guest'
 21 January 1961 - Dickie Valentine, Peggy Mount, Petula Clark and a 'surprise guest'
 28 January 1961 - Gloria DeHaven, Frankie Vaughan, Pete Murray and a 'surprise guest'
 4 February 1961 - Marion Ryan, Monty Babson, Keith Fordyce and a 'surprise guest'
 11 February 1961 – Sid James, Katie Boyle, David Kossoff and a 'surprise guest' (Possibly Mary Peach)
 25 February 1961 - Lita Roza, Glen Mason, Susannah York and a 'surprise guest'
 4 March 1961 - Frankie Howerd, Shirley Abicair, David Gell and a 'surprise guest'
 11 March 1961 - Eric Sykes, Katie Boyle, Jimmy Young and a 'surprise guest'
 18 March 1961 – Glynis Johns, Lita Roza, Alan Freeman and a 'surprise guest'
 25 March 1961 - Lana Morris, Wolf Mankowitz, Ray Orchard and a 'surprise guest'
 1 April 1961 – Beatrice Lillie, Brian Mathew, Jean Bayless, Eric Sykes
 8 April 1961 – Cliff Richard, Janet Munro, Ray Orchard and a 'surprise guest'
 15 April 1961 – Katie Boyle, Zena Marshall, Harry Robinson and Graham Hughes, a teenager from the audience, who was a guest
 22 April 1961 - Jack Jackson, Ian Carmichael, Jill Brown, Frances Bennett
 29 April 1961 - Arthur Askey, David Gell, Jane Murdoch and a 'surprise guest'
 6 May 1961 – Tony Bennett, June Thorburn, Eric Winstone and a 'surprise guest'
 13 May 1961 - Stubby Kaye, Katie Boyle, Bunny Lewis and a 'surprise guest'
 20 May 1961 - Feddie Mills, Jean Metcalfe, Michael Bentine and a 'surprise guest'
 27 May 1961 – Diane Todd, Jack Payne, Alan Freeman and a 'surprise guest'
 3 June 1961 - Russ Conway, Jack Jackson, Kim Tracy and a 'surprise guest'
 10 June 1961 – Sonya Cordeau, Robert Morley, Cliff Richard and a 'surprise guest' Anthea Askey
 17 June 1961 – Alma Cogan, Lonnie Donegan, Nelson Riddle and a 'surprise guest' Mandy Miller
 24 June 1961 – Shirley Bassey, Jack Jackson, Jimmy Henney  and a 'surprise guest' George Hamilton IV
 1 July 1961 – Brian Matthew, Stubby Kaye, Sally Smith and a 'surprise guest'
 8 July 1961 – Sam Costa, Helen Winston, Jack Jackson and a 'surprise guest'
 15 July 1961 - Jimmy Young, Lana Morris, Paul Hollingdale and a 'surprise guest'
 22 July 1961 – Bunny Lewis, Katie Boyle, Eydie Gormé, Steve Lawrence
 29 July 1961 – Spike Milligan, Benny Green, Eira Hughes and a 'surprise guest'
 5 August 1961 - Sammy Cahn, Jack Payne, Helen Shapiro  and a 'surprise guest'
 12 August 1961 - Cliff Michelmore, Derek Hart, Fyfe Robertson, Kenneth Allsop
 19 August 1961 - June Whitfield, Alan Freeman, Glen Mason and a 'surprise guest'
 26 August 1961 - Pete Murray, Jane Asher, John Paddy Carstairs and a 'surprise guest'
 2 September 1961 - Eric Sykes, Shirley Abicair, Scilla Gabel, Ray Orchard
 9 September 1961 - Juliet Mills, David Kossoff, Jimmy Savile and a 'surprise guest'
 16 September 1961 - Shirley Anne Field, Matt Monro, Pete Murray and a 'surprise guest'
 23 September 1961 - Janet Munro, Cyril Ornadel, Jane Asher  and a 'surprise guest'
 30 September 1961 - Howard Keel, Nicole Maurey, Jack Jackson and a 'surprise guest'
 7 October 1961 - Alan Dell, Anne Aubrey, Carole Carr and a 'surprise guest'
 14 October 1961 - Pete Murray, Muriel Young, Lew Luton and a 'surprise guest'
 21 October 1961 – Adam Faith, Alan Freeman, Helen Shapiro and a 'surprise guest'
 28 October 1961 - Jimmy Young, June Marlow, Bunny Lewis  and a 'surprise guest' Zsa Zsa Gabor
 4 November 1961 - Julia Lockwood, Jackie Lane, Sam Costa and a 'surprise guest'
 11 November 1961 - John Leyton, Rita Tushingham, Leila Williams and a 'surprise guest'
 18 November 1961 – Petula Clark, Katie Boyle, Bunny Lewis and a 'surprise guest'
 25 November 1961 - Jack Jackson, Carole Carr, Morey Amsterdam and a 'surprise guest'
 2 December 1961 – Harry Fowler, Jill Browne, June Thorburn, Pete Murray
 9 December 1961 – Acker Bilk, Jane Asher, Jimmy Edwards
 16 December 1961 - Charlie Chester, Alan Dell, Sandy Scott, Barbara Shelley
 23 December 1961 - Katie Boyle, Rosemary Squires, Arthur Askey, Jimmy Young
 26 December 1961 - 'Christmas Special:' Jean Metcalfe, Haley Mills, Pete Murray, Alan Rothwell
 30 December 1961 – Carole Carr, Anita Harris, Sid James, Bunny Lewis

1962

 6 January 1962 - Sam Costa, Alan Freeman, Sandy Scott, Nancy Spain
 13 January 1962 - Shirley Bassey, Susan Castle, Kenneth Hume, Ross Parker
 20 January 1962 – Miriam Karlin, Alan Freeman, Jimmy Henney, June Thorburn
 27 January 1962 - Shirley Eaton, Frank Muir, Pete Murray, Viera
 3 February 1962 - Carole Carr, Denis Norden, Barbara Shelley and a 'surprise guest'
 10 February 1962 - Frances Bennett, Leslie Crowther, Alan Dell, Monica Evans
 17 February 1962 – Petula Clark, George Elrick, Jean Metcalfe, Jimmy Young
 24 February 1962 – Paul Anka, Tony Orlando, Sheila Tracy, Carole Carr
 3 March 1962 – Buddy Greco, June Thorburn, Bobby Vee, Shani Wallis
 10 March 1962 - Katie Boyle, Alan Freeman, Steve Race, Lita Roza
 17 March 1962 - Carole Gray, Millicent Martin, Edward J. Mason, Ray Orchard
 24 March 1962 - Jimmy Young, Carole Carr, Pete Murray, Barbara Shelley
 31 March 1962 - Jane Asher, Alan Dell, Jimmy Henney, Jean Metcalfe
 7 April 1962 – Jack Jackson, Sam Costa, June Marlow, Brenda Lee
 14 April 1962 - Sid James, Miriam Karlin, Carole Carr, Robert Farnon
 21 April 1962 - Nina & Frederik, Alma Cogan, Neil Sedaka
 28 April 1962 – Alan Freeman, Jean Metcalfe, Katie Boyle, Johnny Burnette
 5 May 1962 - Rosemary Squires, Dora Bryan, John Leyton, Pete Murray
 12 May 1962 - Jean Metcalfe, Harry Rabinowitz, Leila Williams and a 'surprise guest'
 19 May 1962 - Steve Race, Sean Connery, Jane Asher, Janet Munro
 26 May 1962 - Eartha Kitt, Rupert Davies, Jimmy Young, Vera Day
 2 June 1962 - Alan Dell, Helen Shapiro, June Thorburn, Terry-Thomas
 9 June 1962 - Dora Bryan, Anne Shelton, David Rose and a 'surprise guest'
 16 June 1962 - Nelson Riddle, Carole Carr, Anne Heywood and a 'surprise guest'
 23 June 1962 - Arthur Askey, Jean Metcalfe, Bill Crozier and a 'surprise guest'
 30 June 1962 - Stubby Kaye, Jimmy Henney, Jenny Angeloglou and a 'surprise guest'
 7 July 1962 - Rosemary Clooney, Roy Castle, Jane Asher and a 'surprise guest'
 14 July 1962 - Jack Jackson, Godfrey Winn, Katie Boyle and a 'surprise guest'
 21 July 1962 - Alan Freeman, Carole Carr, Gary Miller, Sheila Hancock
 28 July 1962 – Alan Dell, Susan Stranks, Shirley Eaton and a 'surprise guest' Jimmy Justice
 4 August 1962 - Brian Rix, Jimmy Young, Rose Brennan and a 'surprise guest' Susan Hampshire
 11 August 1962 - Stubby Kaye, Juliet Mills, Nancy Spain, Bunny Lewis
 18 August 1962 - Ray Conniff, Jean Metcalfe, Eric Sykes, Sylvia Syms
 25 August 1962 - Dora Bryan, Jack Jackson, David Tomlinson and a 'surprise guest' Malou Pantera
 1 September 1962 - Katie Boyle, Jimmy Henney, Robert Morley, Elaine Stritch
 8 September 1962 - Dick Emery, Maggie Fitzgibbon, Alan Freeman and a 'surprise guest' Joan Darling
 15 September 1962 - Rupert Davies, Dion, Fenella Fielding and a 'surprise guest' Jane Asher
 22 September 1962 - Ian Carmichael, Hy Hazell, Mike Sarne and a 'surprise guest'
 29 September 1962 - Liz Fraser, Stan Stennett, Tony Withers and a 'surprise guest' Anne Shelton
 6 October 1962 – Petula Clark, Hattie Jacques, Pete Murray,  and a 'surprise guest' Eric Sykes
 13 October 1962 - Angela Huth, Sid James, Don Moss and a 'surprise guest' Ketty Lester
 20 October 1962 - Claire Bloom, Beryl Reid, Jimmy Young and a 'surprise guest' Jess Conrad
 27 October 1962 - Polly Elwes, Sid James, Steve Race and a 'surprise guest' Beryl Bryden
 3 November 1962 - Sam Costa, Pete Murray, June Thorburn and a 'surprise guest'
 10 November 1962 - Jane Asher, George Hamilton, Stubby Kaye and a 'surprise guest' Catherine Boyle
 17 November 1962 - Edie Adams, Alan Dell,  and two 'surprise guests' Ian Carmichael, Alexandra Bastedo
 24 November 1962 – Jean Metcalfe, Dora Bryan, Kenneth More, Bobby Vee
 1 December 1962 – Arthur Askey, Helen Shaprio and two 'surprise guests' Johnny Mathis and Janette Scott
 8 December 1962 - Carole Carr, Adam Faith, Edmund Purdom and a 'surprise guest' Linda Ludgrove
 15 December 1962 - Lonnie Donegan, Nancy Spain, Mai Zetterling and a 'surprise guest' John Leyton
 22 December 1962 - Alma Cogan, Sheila Hancock, David Tomlinson and a 'surprise guest' Jack Jackson
 25 December 1962 - "Christmas Night With The Stars" Special: Sid James, Sydney Tafler, Terry Scott, Hugh Lloyd, Jill Curzon
 29 December 1962 - Shirley Anne Field, Robert Morley, Jimmy Young and a 'surprise guest' Polly Elwes

1963

 5 January 1963 - Alan Freeman, Spike Milligan, Anne Shelton and a 'surprise guest' Layi Raki
 12 January 1963 - Stubby Kaye, Pete Murray, Siân Phillips and a 'surprise guest' Una Stubbs
 19 January 1963 – Katie Boyle, Susan Maughan, Rolf Harris and a 'surprise guest' Jack Jackson
 26 January 1963 – Jane Asher, Carroll Baker, Brian Hyland, Pete Murray
 2 February 1963 – Sean Connery, Diana Dors, Jean Metcalfe, Mike Sarne
 9 February 1963 - Anthea Askey, Arthur Askey, Steve Rogers, Anne Rogers
 16 February 1963 - Pete Murray, Robin Richmond, Annie Ross, Nancy Spain
 2 March 1963 - Harry H. Corbett, Alan Dell, Dusty Springfield and a 'surprise guest' Millicent Martin
 9 March 1963 - Carole Carr, Spike Milligan, Chris Montez, Janette Scott
 16 March 1963 - Katie Boyle, Angela Douglas, David Gell, Sid James
 23 March 1963 - Jane Asher, Henry Mancini, Pete Murray and a 'surprise guest' Marcie Blane
 30 March 1963 - Jimmy Henney, Hattie Jacques, Eric Sykes, Margaret Whiting
 6 April 1963 –  Alan Freeman, Dolores Gray, Barbara Windsor, Jimmy Young
 13 April 1963 - Arthur Askey, Steve Race, Sabrina, June Thorburn
 20 April 1963 - Alan Dell, Louise Dunn, Harry Fowler, Julia Lockwood
 27 April 1963 - Keith Fordyce, Sheila Hancock, Henry Mancini, Jean Metcalfe
 4 May 1963 - Dora Bryan, Judith Chalmers, Pete Murray and a 'surprise guest'
 11 May 1963 - Carole Carr, Angela Douglas, Del Shannon, Johnny Tillotson
 18 May 1963 - Jacqui Chan, Polly Elwes, Don Moss and a 'surprise guest'
 25 May 1963 - Eva Bartok, Sam Costa, Jimmy Henney, Nancy Spain
 1 June 1963 - Tony Meehan, Barbara Murray, Pete Murray and a 'surprise guest' Annie Ross
 8 June 1963 - Liz Fraser, Millicent Martin, Lance Percival, Jimmy Young
 15 June 1963 - Juliette Gréco, Jean Metcalfe, Peter Sellers, Maurice Woodruff
 22 June 1963 - Jane Asher, Sandy Baron, Alan Dell, Dorothy Peterson
 29 June 1963 – John Lennon, Katie Boyle, Bruce Prochnik, Caroline Maudling
 6 July 1963 – Steve Race, Ian Carmichael, June Ritchie, Alma Cogan
 13 July 1963 – Albert Finney, Esma Cannon, Pip Hinton, Bunny Lewis
 20 July 1963 - Keith Fordyce, Frances Nuyen, Joan Sims, Kenneth Williams
 27 July 1963 - Carol Deene, David Gell, Nancy Spain and a 'surprise guest'
 3 August 1963 - Jimmy Henney, Janette Scott, Angela Douglas, Jimmy Young
 10 August 1963 - Carole Carr, Ted King, Barbara Windsor and a 'surprise guest'
 17 August 1963 – Pat Boone, Polly Elwes, Carole Ann Ford, Vic Lewis
 24 August 1963 – Tom Courtenay, Little Peggy March, Peter Noble and a 'surprise guest'
 31 August 1963 – Terence Edmond, Jean Metcalfe, Don Moss, Polly Perkins
 7 September 1963 - Jane Asher, Alan Freeman, Tommy Roe and a 'surprise guest'
 14 September 1963 - Sam Costa, Louise Dunn, Annie Nightingale, Bruce Prochnik
 21 September 1963 - Dora Bryan, Alan Dell, Adam Faith and a 'surprise guest'
 28 September 1963 – Katie Boyle, Jess Conrad, Pete Murray, Barbara Windsor 
 5 October 1963 - Bunny Lewis, Julia Lockwood, Wolf Mankowitz, Helen Shapiro
 12 October 1963 - Jim Backus, Tonia Bern, Kenny Lynch and a 'surprise guest'
 19 October 1963 – Terence Edmond, Dusty Springfield, Steve Race and a 'surprise guest' (Possibly Cliff Richard)
 26 October 1963 – Brian Epstein, Jimmy Henney, Barbara Young and a 'surprise guest'
 2 November 1963 – Cilla Black, Dick Haymes, Pete Murray and a 'surprise guest' Heinz
 9 November 1963 - Alan Freeman, Fergus McClelland, Annie Ross and a 'surprise guest'
 16 November 1963 – Edmund Purdom, Linda Christian, Alan Dell, Jane Asher (deputising for Dee Dee Sharp, who was unable to appear)
 23 November 1963 – Cilla Black, Sid James, Don Moss, Anna Quayle
 30 November 1963 - June Ritchie, Nancy Spain, Jimmy Young and a 'surprise guest'
 7 December 1963 – The Beatles, (surprise guest – Cilla Black)
 14 December 1963 – Neal Arden, Katie Boyle, Freddie Garrity and a 'surprise guest' Gay Emma
 21 December 1963 – Alma Cogan, Angela Douglas, Rolf Harris, Mitch Murray and a 'surprise guest'
 25 December 1963 "Christmas Night With The Stars Special" - Stanley Baxter portrayed four panelists
 28 December 1963 - Polly Elwes, Matt Monro, Jimmy Savile and a 'surprise guest'

1964

 4 January 1964 – Peter Sellers, Dora Bryan, David Gell and a 'surprise guest' Cilla Black
 11 January 1964 – Andrea Allan, Eva Bartok, Pete Murray and a 'surprise guest' Dave Clark
 18 January 1964 - Jane Asher, Vic Lewis, Robert Morley and a 'surprise guest'
 25 January 1964 – Adam Faith, Carole Ann Ford, Jean Metcalfe and a 'surprise guest' Phil Spector
 1 February 1964 - Susan Maughan, Jane Morgan, Ian Fenner, Bruce Prochnik
 8 February 1964 – Alan Freeman, Allan Sherman, Vivienne Taylor and a 'surprise guest' Elke Sommer
 15 February 1964 – Lesley Duncan, Steve Race, Sally Smith and a 'surprise guest'
 22 February 1964 – Sam Costa, Susan Hampshire, James Garner and a 'surprise guest' Cilla Black
 29 February 1964 - Jane Asher, Dora Bryan, Brian Epstein, Gerry Marsden of The Pacemakers
 7 March 1964 – Terence Edmond, Annette Funicello, Bob Monkhouse, Karen Elliott
 14 March 1964 – Maureen Cleave, Millicent Martin, Matt Monro, Bobby Vee
 21 March 1964 – Kathy Kirby, Henry Mancini, Jean Metcalfe, Spike Milligan
 28 March 1964 - Arthur Askey, Ted King, Beverley Todd and a 'surprise guest'
 4 April 1964 - Julia Foster, Derek Johnson, Eric Sykes, Mary Travers of Peter, Paul and Mary
 11 April 1964 - Sid James, Sarah Miles, Jimmy Young and a 'surprise guest'
 18 April 1964 – Iain Gregory, Cilla Black, Katie Boyle, Tommy Trinder
 25 April 1964 – Honor Blackman, Dick Emery, Alan Freeman, Mia Farrow
 2 May 1964 – Freddie Garrity, Maureen Cleave, Dick Haymes, Barbara Windsor
 9 May 1964 – Millicent Small (Millie), Carole Carr, Pete Murray, Frankie Vaughan
 16 May 1964 - Roy Castle, Judith Chalmers, Libby Morris, Billy Walker
 23 May 1964 - Stratford Johns, Lance Pervical, Jean Metcalfe, Polly Perkins
 30 May 1964 – Ken Dodd, Pete Murray, Rosemary Nicholls, Marjorie Proops
 6 June 1964 – Diana Dors, Charlie Drake, Bunny Lewis, Jessie Matthews
 13 June 1964 – Adam Faith, Zsa Zsa Gabor, Des O'Connor, Juliet Prowse
 20 June 1964 – Jane Asher, Davy Kaye, Stirling Moss, Anne Heywood
 27 June 1964 – Dorothy Dandridge, Bill Owen, Jimmy Savile, Janette Scott
 4 July 1964 – The Rolling Stones
 11 July 1964 - Lionel Jeffries, Stubby Kaye, Annie Nightingale, Tessie O'Shea
 18 July 1964 – Brian Epstein, Dora Bryan, Ian Hendry, Nancy Roberts
 25 July 1964 – George Harrison, Reg Varney, Carole Ann Ford and a 'surprise guest'
 1 August 1964 – Ringo Starr, Katie Boyle, Judy Cornwell, Ray Martine
 8 August 1964 - Unity Hall, Kenneth More, Chita Rivera, Cardew Robinson
 15 August 1964 - Max Bacon, Caroline Charles, Maureen Cleave, Laurence Harvey
 22 August 1964 - Bernard Bresslaw, Derek Johnson, Brenda Lee, Ginette Spanier
 29 August 1964 - Susan Baker, Millicent Martin, Stanley Unwin, Jimmy Savile
 5 September 1964 - Antony Booth, Diane Cilento, Laurie Henshaw, Barbara Roscoe
 12 September 1964 - Dawn Addams, Don Moss, Vivienne Ventura and a 'surprise guest'
 19 September 1964 - Honor Blackman, Arthur Askey, Adam Faith, Lulu
 26 September 1964 - Roy Castle, Pete Murray, Adrienne Posta and 'surprise guest' Sandie Shaw (This jury was reunited in 1983 for the BBC's The Time of Your Life hosted by Noel Edmonds, when Shaw was again a surprise for the three jurors who had just (accurately as it transpired) judged her single Wish I Was as a 'miss'.
 3 October 1964 - Jane Asher, Alan Freeman, Gene Pitney and a 'surprise guest'
 10 October 1964 - Judith Chalmers, Peter Cook, P. J. Proby, Julie Rogers
 17 October 1964 - Des O'Connor, Mary Wells, Jimmy Young and a 'surprise guest'
 24 October 1964 - Sid James, Andrew Loog Oldham, The Marchioness of Tavistock and a 'surprise guest'
 31 October 1964 – Marianne Faithfull, Don Wardell, Petula Clark, Stubby Kaye
 7 November 1964 - Rolf Harris, Portland Mason, Gene Pitney, Maggie Stredder
 14 November 1964 - Joe Brown, Terence Edmond, Jackie DeShannon and a 'surprise guest'
 21 November 1964 – Liza Minnelli, Alma Cogan, Spike Milligan, Pete Murray
 28 November 1964 - Lulu, Jean Metcalfe, Eric Morecambe, Ernie Wise
 5 December 1964 - Diahann Carroll, Vic Lewis, Pete Murray, Sandie Shaw
 12 December 1964 - Lonnie Donegan, Shirley Eaton, Jimmy Edwards, Polly Elwes
 19 December 1964 - Marianne Faithful, Sheila Hancock, Tony Hatch, Kenneth Williams
 26 December 1964 - Alan Freeman, Nyree Dawn Porter, William Rushton, Susannah York

1965

 9 January 1965 - David Healy, Peggy Mount, Pete Murray, Dusty Springfield
 16 January 1965 - Katie Boyle, Maureen Cleave, Rupert Davies, Richard Wattis
 23 January 1965 - Angela Douglas, Virginia Lewis, Wolf Mankowitz, Del Shannon
 30 January 1965 - Paul Anka, Stubby Kaye, Julie Samuel, Miss World Ann Sidney
 6 February 1965 - Thora Hird, Linda Lewis, Don Moss, Gene Pitney
 13 February 1965 - Brian Epstein, Marianne Faithful, Adrienne Posta, Ted Ray
 20 February 1965 - Chris Hutchins, Lulu, Roy Orbison, Marjorie Proops
 27 February 1965 - Jane Asher, Bill Crozier, Georgie Fame, Jean Metcalfe
 6 March 1965 - Tom Jones, Barbara Mullen, Jacqueline Jones, Pete Murray
 20 March 1965 - Georgia Brown, Paul Jones, Edmund Purdom and a 'surprise guest'
 27 March 1965 - Peter Carver, Roy Castle, Marlene Laird, Joan Turner
 3 April 1965 – Katie Boyle, Adam Faith, Sue Lloyd, David Tomlinson
 10 April 1965 - Hermione Gingold, Stubby Kaye, Tom Springfield, Dionne Warwick
 17 April 1965 - Tony Bennett, Eartha Kitt, Marianne Faithful, Ted Rogers
 24 April 1965 - Val Doonican, Judy Huxtable, Pete Murray, Julie Rogers
 1 May 1965 – Dave Clark, Dora Bryan, Sarah Miles, Chris Andrews
 15 May 1965 - Tsai Chin, Russ Conway, Suzy Kendall, Les Reed
 22 May 1965 - Mrs. Mills, Pete Murray, Harvey Orkin, Sandie Shaw
 29 May 1965 - Bill Maynard, Don Moss, Barbara Shelley, Rita Tushingham
 5 June 1965 - Paul Jones, Alan Freeman, Luciana Paluzzi, Ginette Spanier
 12 June 1965 - Gay Byrne, Noel Harrison, Lita Roza, Jackie Trent
 19 June 1965 - Bill Crozier, Susan Hampshire, Stubby Kaye, Una Stubbs
 26 June 1965 - Sam Costa, Miriam Karlin, Sylvie Vartan, Bobby Vinton
 3 July 1965 - Astrud Gilberto, Magda Kanopka, Vic Lewis, Wolf Mankowitz
 10 July 1965 - Amanda Barrie, Chris Curtis, Dionne Warwick, Jimmy Young
 17 July 1965 - Ray Brooks, Angela Douglas, Stubby Kaye, Millie
 24 July 1965 - Georgie Fame, Goldie, Sheila Hancock, Pete Murray
 31 July 1965 - Jackie Collins, Alan Freeman, Jackie Rae, June Thorburn
 7 August 1965 - Katie Boyle, Billy Daniels, Don Moss, Helen Shapiro
 14 August 1965 - Ian Carmichael, Mike Hurst, Jacqueline Jones, Sue Thompson
 21 August 1965 - Carole Carr, Terence Edmond, Herman, Rosemary Nichols
 28 August 1965 - Jill Browne, Alan Clark, Lee Francis, Pete Murray
 4 September 1965 - Victor Borge, Helen Cherry, Adam Faith, Sandie Shaw
 11 September 1965 - Val Doonican, Dudley Moore, Barbara Ferris, Marion Montgomery
 18 September 1965 - Lucy Bartlett, Sam Costa, Rolf Harris, Nancy Wilson
 25 September 1965 – Petula Clark, Buddy Greco, Virginia Lewis, Jonathan King
 2 October 1965 - Tito Burns, Maureen Cleave, Vince Hill and a 'surprise guest'
 9 October 1965 - Louise Cordet, Julie Felix, Lance Percival, Leslie Phillips
 16 October 1965 - Danny Piercy, Gene Pitney, Marion Ryan, Ginette Spanier
 23 October 1965 - Lulu, Henry Mancini, Chrissie Shrimpton, Billy Walker
 30 October 1965 - Herman, Maurice Kinn and two 'surprise guests'
 6 November 1965 – Dave Clark, Lynda Baron, Alexandra Bastedo, Pete Murray
 13 November 1965 - Bill Kerr, Sandie Shaw, David Wigg, Muriel Young
 20 November 1965 - Ian Fenner, Suzanna Leigh, Kenny Lynch, Patrice Wymore
 27 November 1965 - Brian Epstein, Juliette Greco, Françoise Hardy, Hugh Lloyd
 4 December 1965 – Simon Dee, Carolyn Hester, Statford Johns, Ketty Lester
 11 December 1965 - Miss World Lesley Langley, Mickie Most, Dakota Staton, Johnny Tillotson
 18 December 1965 - Cilla Black, Con Cluskey, Peter Haigh, Edina Ronay

1966

 1 January 1966 - Max Bygraves and his family including 'Uncle Eric'
 8 January 1966 - Katie Boyle, Paul Jones, Dee Dee Warwick, Pete Murray
 15 January 1966 – Colin Blunstone, Tito Burns, Libby Morris, Veronica Strong
 22 January 1966 - Peter Cook, Bryan Forbes, Dudley Moore, Nanette Newman
 29 January 1966 - Spencer Davis, Maurice Kinn, Marion Ryan and a 'surprise guest'
 5 February 1966 - Alan Freeman, Hayley Mills, Marianne Faithful, Jimmy Greaves
 12 February 1966 – Pete Murray, Lulu, Eddy Arnold, Barbara Windsor
 19 February 1966 - Manfred Mann, Eva Bartok, Mike Douglas, Emily Yancy
 26 February 1966 - Scott Walker, Judy Geeson, Don Moss, Evelyn Taylor
 5 March 1966 - Eric Burdon, Malou Pantera, Gene Pitney, Briony Newton
 12 March 1966 - Bert Kaempfert, Patsy Ann Noble, Brian Matthew, Wendy Varnals
 19 March 1966 - Adam Faith, Shirley Anne Field, Jeannie Carson, Jimmy Young
 26 March 1966 - Nina & Frederik, Adrienne Posta, Ray Davies of The Kinks
 2 April 1966 - Millicent Martin, Kenneth Williams, Vicki Carr, Pete Murray
 9 April 1966 - Sandie Shaw, Dave Clark, Katie Boyle, Stubby Kaye
 16 April 1966 – Simon Dee, Val Doonican, Rosemary Nicols, Julie Rogers
 23 April 1966 - Roy Orbison, Jimmy Savile, Barbara Hawkins, Samantha Juste
 30 April 1966 - Roy Hudd, Judith Chalmers, Ian Fenner and a 'surprise guest'
 7 May 1966 - Spike Milligan, Lulu, Georgie Fame, Gunilla Hutton
 14 May 1966 - Helen Shapiro, Jimmy Witherspoon, Janice Whiteman, Frank De Vol
 21 May 1966 - Jonathan King, Pamela Donald, Bill Mann, Maureen Cleave
 28 May 1966 - Trini Lopez, Lulu, Maurice Kinn and a 'surprise guest'
 4 June 1966 - Petula Clark, Eric Burdon, Billy Walker, Geraldine Sherman
 11 June 1966 - Pete Murray, Anne Allen, Jay and a 'surprise guest'
 18 June 1966 - Richard Anthony, Ernestine Anderson, Sam Costa, Annie Nightingale
 25 June 1966 - Gene Pitney, Susan Maughan, Denny Piercy, Betty Marsden
 9 July 1966 - Geneveve, Alan Freeman, Blossom Dearie, Frederick Woods
 23 July 1966 - Paul Jones, Brian Matthew, Penny Valentine, Katie Boyle
 30 July 1966 - Dave Cash, Joy Marshall, Jackie Stewart, Susan Hampshire
 6 August 1966 - Bernard Cribbins, Rosemary Squires, Kay Medford, Barry Alldis
 13 August 1966 - Vivianne Ventura, Anthony Booth, Simon Dee, Sheila Southern
 20 August 1966 - Don Moss, Patsy Ann Noble, Meg Wynn Owen, Fred Emney
 27 August 1966 - Juliet Harmer, Engelbert Humperdinck, Danny Wells, Sarah Ward
 10 September 1966 - Jackie Trent, Judith Arthy, Pete Murray, Chris Farlowe
 17 September 1966 - Marion Montgomery, Fanny Cradock, Michael D'Abo, Chris Denning
 24 September 1966 - Lulu, Alma Cogan, Reg Varney, Jimmy Henney
 1 October 1966 - Una Stubbs, Lena Martell, Kenneth Home, Jimmy Young
 8 October 1966 - Lynn Redgrave, Penny Valentine, Lionel Bart, Ronnie Carroll
 15 October 1966 - Julie Rogers, David Hughes, Scott Hamilton, Truly Smith
 22 October 1966 - Sandie Shaw, Gary Stephens, Mike Felix, Marion Ryan
 29 October 1966 - Rita Tushingham, Moira Lister, Adam Faith, Johnny Devlin
 5 November 1966 - Brian Poole, Julia Foster, Dave Clark, Francoise Hardy
 12 November 1966 - Susan Maughan, Ted Rogers, Carole Carr, Bobby Goldsboro
 19 November 1966 - Herman, Katie Boyle, Ron Goodwin, Mia Lewis
 26 November 1966 - Cleo Laine, Eric Burdon, Virginia Ironside and a 'surprise guest'
 3 December 1966 - Alan Freeman, Simon Dee, Pete Murray, Jimmy Savile
 10 December 1966 - Julie Felix, The Bachelors (Declan Cluskey, Con Cluskey, John Stokes)
 17 December 1966 - Paul Jones, Rose Brennan, Mickie Most and a 'surprise guest'
 24 December 1966 - The Seekers, (Judith Durham, Bruce Woodley, Keith Potger & Anthony Guy)
 31 December 1966 - Simon Dee, Alan Freeman, Pete Murray, Jimmy Savile

1967

 7 January 1967 – 18 February 1967 (all 7 editions) - Pete Murray, Alan Freeman, Jimmy Savile, Simon Dee
 25 February 1967 - Pete Murray, Jimmy Savile, Virginia Wetherill, Penny Valentine
 4 March 1967 - Simon Dee, Alan Freeman, Ross Hannaman, Geraldine Sherman
 11 March 1967 - Pete Murray, Miss World Reita Faria, Jimmy Savile, Judy Geeson
 18 March 1967 - Alan Freeman, Julia Foster, Simon Dee, Maggie Clews
 25 March 1967 - Jayne Mansfield, Lulu, Pete Murray, Jimmy Savile
 1 April 1967 - Una Stubbs, Alan Freeman, Virginia Ironside, Simon Dee
 8 April 1967 - Jimmy Savile, Maggie London, Mike d'Abo, Polly Devlin
 15 April 1967 - Pete Murray, Nyree Dawn Porter, Ray Davies, Charlotte Bingham
 22 April 1967 - Paul Jones, Janet Munro, Gerald Harper, Andee Silver
 29 April 1967 - Hank Marvin, Bruce Welch, Vicki Carr, Anneke Wills
 6 May 1967 - Val Doonican, Sandie Shaw, Alan Freeman, Isabel Black
 13 May 1967 - Cliff Richard, Anita Harris, Roy Hudd, Leila Pasha
 20 May 1967 - Leslie Crowther, Julie Felix, Shirley Anne Field, Kenny Everett
 27 May 1967 - Dusty Springfield, Keith Barron, Judith Chalmers, Mickie Most
 3 June 1967 - Bernard Cribbins, Amanda Barrie, Vince Hill, Annie Nightingale
 10 June 1967 - Gene Pitney, Georgia Brown, Lance Percival, Isabel Black
 17 June 1967 - Rolf Harris, Jackie Trent, David Symonds, Charlotte Rampling
 24 June 1967 - Del Shannon, Dawn Addams, Pete Murray, Sheila Steafel
 1 July 1967 - Janette Scott, Chris Denning, Mel Tormé, Penny Valentine
 15 July 1967 - Adam Faith, Annette Andre, Ray Fell, Salena Jones
 22 July 1967 - Alan Freeman, Anita Harris, Billy Walker, Maggie Clews
 29 July 1967 – Engelbert Humperdinck, Lulu, Ted Ray, Beverley Adams
 5 August 1967 – Judith Durham, Athol Guy, Mike Quinn (The Seekers), Barbara Windsor
 12 August 1967 - Libby Morris, John Walker, Bruce Johnston, Ross Hannaman
 19 August 1967 - Beryl Reid, Vince Hill, Pik-Sen Lim, David Symonds
 26 August 1967 - Jessie Matthews, Tsai Chin, Cat Stevens, Tony Blackburn
 2 September 1967 - Beatrice Lillie, Georgie Fame, Viviane Ventura, Keith Skues
 9 September 1967 - P. J. Proby, Yolande Bavan, Pete Murray, Jennifer Lewis
 16 September 1967 - Neil McCallum, Marjorie Proops, Dave Cash, Annette Day
 23 September 1967 - Clement Freud, Kiki Dee, James Fox, Penny Valentine
 27 September 1967 - Sandie Shaw, Alan Freeman, Joan Bakewell, Mike Newman (replacing Richard Deacon)
 4 October 1967 – Bob Monkhouse, Julia Foster, Chris Denning and a 'surprise guest'
 11 October 1967 - Jimmy Savile, Ronnie Corbett, Sheila Steafel, Anita Harris
 18 October 1967 – Tony Hall (replacing Cy Coleman), Ted Ray, Penny Valentine and a 'surprise guest' 
 25 October 1967 - Tony Hatch, Jackie Trent, Stuart Henry and a 'halloween surprise guest'
 1 November 1967 – Mickie Most, Reg Presley and two 'surprise guests'
 8 November 1967 - Show Cancelled. Scheduled guests had been: Tony Blackburn, Gene Pitney, Brenda Lee.
 15 November 1967 - Lulu, Lord Arran, Scott Walker and a 'surprise guest'
 22 November 1967 – Long John Baldry, Jean Metcalfe (replacing Julie Felix), Pete Murray, Felice Taylor
 29 November 1967 - J. J. Jackson, Les Reed, Aimi MacDonald, Penny Valentine (who replaced Emperor Rosko)
 6 December 1967 – Twiggy, Justin de Villeneuve, Tony Blackburn, Julie Felix
 13 December 1967 – Hattie Jacques, Barry Mason, Emperor Rosko and a 'surprise guest'
 20 December 1967 - Pete Murray, Bobby Vee and two other guests
 27 December 1967 – Pete Murray, Susan Stranks, Lulu and Eric Sykes

1979 series
Hosted by Noel Edmonds. Each show featured a jury of four celebrities and one or two surprise guests whose records were judged by the jury.

 16 June 1979 – Jury: Pete Murray, Bob Geldof, Linda Lewis, Isla St Clair. Surprise guest: Patti Boulaye.
 23 June 1979 – Jury: Flick Colby, Anne Nightingale, Joe Brown, David Wilkie. Surprise guests: Child & Violinski.
 30 June 1979 – Jury: Elaine Paige, Johnny Rotten, Alan Freeman, Joan Collins. Surprise guests: The Monks & Adrian Munsey.
 7 July 1979 – Jury: Dusty Springfield, Tony Blackburn, Jonathan King, Britt Ekland. Surprise guests: Black Lace.
 14 July 1979 – Jury: Jimmy Savile, Lorraine Chase, Amii Stewart, Billy Idol. Surprise guests: Sparks.
 28 July 1979 – Jury: Mike Batt, Patti Boulaye, Bob Geldoff, Mike Read. Surprise guests: Dollar & Jimmy Pursey.
 4 August 1979 – Jury: Rick Wakeman, Judie Tzuke, Billy Connolly, Jimmy Pursey. Surprise guests: The Starjets.
 11 August 1979 – Jury: Tina Charles, Kenny Everett, Lesley Judd, Sting. Surprise guests: Chas & Dave.
 18 August 1979 – Jury: Dave Bartram, Keith Chegwin, Dana, Bonnie Tyler. Surprise guests: Pan's People. 
(The series had a one-week break on 21 July.)

1989 series
(filmed in Newcastle upon Tyne, 1989), hosted by Jools Holland

 24 September 1989 – Julian Clary, Jermaine Jackson, Simon Climie, Paris Gray. (Isaac Hayes was billed to appear, but did not take part)
 1 October 1989 – Fish, Cat, Adrian Edmondson, Courtney Pine
 8 October 1989 – Dawn French, Jennifer Saunders, Francis Rossi, Julia Fordham
 15 October 1989 – Siouxsie Sioux, Tony Hadley, Helen Lederer, Frank Bruno
 22 October 1989 – Tim Rice, Adeva, Vic Reeves, Norman Cook
 29 October 1989 – Lulu, Kit Hollerbach, Gary Stretch, Glen Tilbrook
 5 November 1989 – David Essex, Antoine de Caunes, Ade Edmondson, Rebel MC
 12 November 1989 – Leee John (replaced by a late Mica Paris half-way through), Matt Goss, Luke Goss, Tom Watkins
 19 November 1989 – Jerry Sadowicz, Tim Pope, Mark Shaw, Zeke Manyka
 26 November 1989 – Simon O'Brien, Lloyd Cole, Pam Hogg, Slim Gaillard
 3 December 1989 – Jermaine Stewart, Carol Decker, Bruno Brookes, Jeremy Hardy

1990 series
(filmed in London, 1990) host – Jools Holland

 23 September 1990 – Maria McKee, Peter Hooton, Michelle Collins, Richard O'Brien
 30 September 1990 – Alan Freeman, Neneh Cherry, John Fashanu, Vic Reeves and Bob Mortimer
 7 October 1990 – Anthony Wilson, Rachael Lindsay, Shaun Ryder, Barbara Windsor
 14 October 1990 – KRS-One, Rowland Rivron, Jakki Brambles, Kevin Kennedy
 21 October 1990 – Jonathan Ross, Jonathon Morris, Black Francis, Kym Mazelle
 28 October 1990 – Craig Ferguson, Tracey MacLeod, Robert Smith, Durga McBroom
 4 November 1990 – Katie Boyle, Margaret Thatcher portrayed by Steve Nallon
 11 November 1990 – Neil Campbell, Brian Travers
 18 November 1990 – Bernard Sumner, Pat Cash, Linda Hartley, Bootsy Collins. (Betty Boo was scheduled but did not participate).
 25 November 1990 – Dusty Springfield, Bob Geldof, Monie Love, Rowland Rivron

References

External links

 
 Sixties City https://web.archive.org/web/20111201063335/http://www.sixtiescity.com/PopTV/JukeBoxJury.shtm
 https://jukeboxjury.uk/

BBC Television shows
Lost BBC episodes
1959 British television series debuts
1990 British television series endings
1950s British music television series
1960s British music television series
1970s British music television series
1980s British music television series
1990s British music television series
British television series revived after cancellation
Musical game shows
Television programmes about the Beatles
English-language television shows